George Spink Fleming (4 November 1859 – 1 April 1912) was a Scottish footballer. He was the first player to score for Everton in the Football League, scoring twice in a 2–1 win against Accrington on the competition's opening day.

Described as a hard-running forward, able to occupy all five front-line positions, he produced his best form on the wing. Signed in August 1885 he scored 45 goals in 82 games before the Football League era began in 1888.

George Fleming made his League debut on 8 September 1888, playing as a winger, at Anfield, then the home of Everton. The home team defeated the visitors, Accrington 2–1 and George Fleming scored both goals scoring the first Everton League goal and the first Everton player to score two–in–a–League–match. When George Fleming played as a winger on 15 September 1888 against Notts County he was 28 years 316 days old; that made him, on that second weekend of League football, Everton's oldest player. George Fleming appeared in four of the 22 League matches played by Everton in season 1888–89 and scored two League goals. Both his League goals were scored in the same match.

References

1859 births
1912 deaths
Everton F.C. players
English Football League players
People from Arbroath
Scottish footballers
Association football utility players
Association football forwards
Association football outside forwards
Footballers from Angus, Scotland